Birch Creek is an unincorporated community in Menominee County, in the U.S. state of Michigan.

The community is on US Route 41 approximately four miles north of Menominee. The stream for which it is named flows past approximately one mile east of the village.

The community was named after nearby Birch Creek.

References

Unincorporated communities in Menominee County, Michigan
Unincorporated communities in Michigan